Dhobaura is an upazila of the Mymensingh District in Bangladesh.

History
Since ancient times, Dhobaura has been inhabited by the Garo people. During the Mughal period, a mosque was built in the village of Darsha which is now in ruins.

Dhobaura was formerly known as Jikkowa Bazar. In the mid 18th-century, the area was home to Babu Gauriballabh Sen, a prominent agriculturalist. At that time a number of dhobis led by a dhobi named Sita lived on the bank of a pond (today known as Sita Dighi) that was part of Sen's agricultural land. One day, Sita went missing and could not be found. Her body was found a few days later, floating in the pond. Thinking it was a ghostly incident, Sita's dhobis left the bank and migrated to an unknown place without informing anyone. The village then came to be known as Dhobaura, meaning floating dhoba in the Bengali language. A mouza centred in Dhobaura was later established and not long after it became a union parishad. In 1976, Dhobaura became a thana and in 1983 it was upgraded to an upazila.

From 1937 to 1949, Moni Singh's tanka movement spread to Dhobaura. During the Bangladesh Liberation War of 1971, a confrontation took place between the freedom fighters and the Pakistan Army on 19 July. 11 people were killed, including two freedom fighters. On 3 October at midnight, the Pakistani army surprise attacked the Mukti Bahini camp at Guatala Bazar, murdering four freedom fighters. A mass killing was conducted the next day in the same place as well as in Taraikandi Ferry Ghat leading to 120 deaths. 7 mass graves were discovered in Guatala, Taraikandi, Zigatala, Defulia Para, Digalbagh, Milagara and Goborchena.

Geography
Dhobaura Upazila (mymensingh district) with an area of 251.880 km2, is bounded by Meghalaya (Indian) on the north, Phulpur and Purbadhala upazilas on the south, Durgapur upazila on the east, Haluaghat upazila on the west. Main rivers are Nitai and Kangsa. There are many hillocks on the north region of the upazila.

It has 44,007 households and total area 251.880 km2.

Demographics
As of the 2011 Bangladesh census, Dhobaura has a population of 42,7913. Males constitute 47.30% of the population, and females 52.70%. This Upazila's adult population (18 and above) is 113,348. Dhobaura has an average literacy rate of 65%.

According to the 2011 Bangladesh census, Dhobaura had a population of 196,284. Males constituted 49.14% of the population and females 50.86%. Muslims formed 91.38% of the population, Hindus 3.52%, Christians 5.05% and others 0.05%. Dhobaura had a literacy rate of 29.36% for the population 7 years and above.

The upazila is home to Bengali Muslims, Bengali Hindus, as well as the Garo and Hajong people. Languages prevalent in the upazila include Bengali, Arabic, English, Garo and Hajong.

Economy and tourism
A porcelain mine was discovered in the village of Vedikura in Dakshin Maijpara union. A number of Dhobaura's residents are employed abroad in countries such as Malaysia, Saudi Arabia, Bahrain, Kuwait, Singapore and the United Arab Emirates.

There are a number of tourist attractions in Dhobaura Upazila. The historic village of Darsha has a very old 3.3 acre pond known as Patharkata as well as ruins of a mosque dating back to the Mughal era. The 7.4 acre Dharam Shah reservoir in Langaljora, Gamaritala is also quite popular. Dhobaura is also home to the practice of bullfighting.

Administration
Dhobaura thana, now an upazila, was established in 1976.

Porakandulia. The union parishads are subdivided into 99 mauzas and 164 villages.

The area of the town is 3.82 km2. The town has one dak bungalow.

Education
Average literacy 65%; male 68% and female 62%. Educational institutions: college 3, high school 20, junior high school 3, madrasa 6, government primary school 43, non-government 44 and kindergarten school 6.

See also
 Upazilas of Bangladesh
 Districts of Bangladesh
 Divisions of Bangladesh

References

Upazilas of Mymensingh District